Cristoval "Boo" Nieves (born January 23, 1994) is an American professional ice hockey forward who is currently an unrestricted free agent.  He was drafted by the Rangers, 59th overall, in the 2012 NHL Entry Draft.

Playing career
As a youth, Nieves played in the 2007 Quebec International Pee-Wee Hockey Tournament with a minor ice hockey team from Syracuse, New York. He played scholastic hockey with Kent School before a short junior hockey stint for the Indiana Ice in the United States Hockey League (USHL). He played collegiate hockey for the University of Michigan from 2012 to 2016. On March 28, 2016, Nieves signed a two-year, entry-level contract with the New York Rangers.

Nieves made his NHL debut on November 15, 2016, against the Vancouver Canucks. On October 26, 2017, in his second NHL game, Nieves scored his first point and in total had three assists in a 5–2 victory over the Arizona Coyotes.

On January 1, 2021, Nieves accepted a professional tryout invitation to attend the Tampa Bay Lightning training camp. Nearing the conclusion of camp, on January 12, 2021, Nieves was signed to a one-year, two-way contract with the Lightning. Nieves was assigned to Syracuse, but would not appear in a game during the season due to a head injury.

Career statistics

Regular season and playoffs

International

References

External links

 

1994 births
Living people
American men's ice hockey centers
Hartford Wolf Pack players
Ice hockey players from New York (state)
Indiana Ice players
Kent School alumni
Michigan Wolverines men's ice hockey players
New York Rangers draft picks
New York Rangers players